Rufus King Boyd (1831 – May 10, 1883) served as the 18th Secretary of State of Alabama from 1874 to 1878.

In December 1865, Boyd relocated to Guntersville, AL and formed a law firm with Louis Wyeth, a judge, under the name of Wyeth & Boyd.

He got married in 1866.

References

Alabama Democrats
Secretaries of State of Alabama
People from Guntersville, Alabama
Alabama lawyers
1831 births
1883 deaths
People from Williamson County, Tennessee
19th-century American lawyers